The 2021–22 season was HNK Hajduk Split's 111th season in existence and the club's 31st consecutive season in the top flight of Croatian football. In addition to the domestic league, Hajduk Split participated in and won this season's edition of the Croatian Cup and the UEFA Europa Conference League. The season covers the period from 1 July 2021 to 30 June 2022.

First-team squad
For details of former players, see List of HNK Hajduk Split players.

Competitions

Overview

HT Prva liga

Classification

Results summary

Results by round

Results by opponent

Source: 2021–22 Croatian First Football League article

Matches

Friendlies

Pre-season

On-season

Mid-season

HT Prva liga

Croatian Cup

UEFA Europa Conference League

Second qualifying round

Player seasonal records
Updated 27 May 2022

Goals

Source: Competitive matches

Clean sheets

Source: Competitive matches

Disciplinary record

Appearances and goals

Transfers

In

Total Spending:  1,975,000 €

Out

Total Income:  4,400,000 €

Total expenditure:  2,425,000 €

Promoted from youth squad

Notes

References

External links

HNK Hajduk Split seasons
Hajduk Split
Hajduk Split